The discography of Bob Seger, an American rock artist, includes 18 studio albums, two live albums, five compilation albums and more than 60 singles (including regional releases and collaborations). Bob Seger's albums have sold over 50 million copies and received seven multi-platinum, four Platinum and two Gold certifications by the RIAA.

With the single exception of 1972's Smokin' O.P.'s, re-released on CD with remastered sound by Capitol in 2005, all of Seger's albums prior to 1975's Beautiful Loser (the pre-Silver Bullet Band releases) have long remained out of print. The albums Ramblin' Gamblin' Man (1969), Mongrel (1970) and Seven (1974) were briefly available on CD in 1993. Noah (1969), Brand New Morning (1971) and Back in '72 (1973) were available only on vinyl/tape formats and have never been officially reissued on CD, but all three were unofficially reissued in 2008 in Argentina on the Lost Diamonds label.

Albums

Studio albums

The Bob Seger System (1969–1970)

Bob Seger (1971–1975, 2006–2017)

Bob Seger & The Silver Bullet Band (1976–1995)

Live albums

Compilation albums

Singles

1960s

1970s

1980s

1990s–2010s

Guest singles

Guest appearances

Bob Seger was considered for quite a few more film soundtracks that he ultimately did not appear on. In 1983, after the success of "Old Time Rock and Roll" in Risky Business (1983) starring Tom Cruise, the song "No Man's Land" was slated for Cruise's next film All the Right Moves (1983).

In 1985, Seger was asked to write the title track for Back to the Future (1985), but eventually "The Power of Love" by Huey Lewis and the News was used instead and became a massive hit. Seger's song was called "Yesterday Rules"; he performed the song live on his 1986 tour. That same year the unreleased song "Can't Hit the Corners No More", which had been recorded for Against the Wind (1980), was scheduled to appear on the soundtrack to The Color of Money (1986), again starring Tom Cruise, but that never happened.

In 1989, Seger was invited to record Roy Orbison's "Pretty Woman" as the title track for the movie of the same name (1990), but he turned the offer down, because he was doing recordings for his upcoming album, The Fire Inside (1991), at the time.

The song "Roll Me Away" was used in the 1984 movie Reckless and "Feel Like a Number" was used in the 1993 movie Striking Distance.

Music videos

Notes

References

External links
 Official website
 
 Bob Seger biography by Stephen Thomas Erlewine, discography and album reviews, credits & releases at AllMusic.com
 Bob Seger discography, album releases & credits at Discogs.com
 Bob Seger albums to be listened as stream at Spotify.com

Rock music discographies
Discographies of American artists